Vijendra Kumar Yadav (born 1962) is an Indian politician and a member of Bihar Legislative Assembly of India. He represented the Sandesh constituency in Bhojpur district of Bihar. He was elected in 2000 as a member of Rashtriya Janata Dal (RJD) but later left the party to join JD(U).

Career
Vijendra Yadav become first time MLA in 2000 from Sandesh constituency by defeating Rameshwar Prasad (sitting MLA) and Sondhari Singh Yadav of Samata Party (ex-MLA).

Vijendra Yadav lost the February 2005 Bihar Legislative Assembly election to Rameshwar Prasad, but again re-elected to same constituency in October 2005 and remained till 2010.

In 2010 Bihar Legislative Assembly election, Vijendra Yadav and his younger brother Arun Yadav both contested against each other from Sandesh constituency. But both of them lost to Sanjay Singh Tiger of the Bharatiya Janata Party (BJP).

Family
His younger brother Arun Yadav was MLA of Sandesh from 2015 to 2020. In 2020 Bihar Legislative Assembly election, Vijendra Yadav lost to his sister-in-law Kiran Devi Yadav of RJD. Kiran Yadav is wife of Arun Yadav.

References

Rashtriya Janata Dal politicians
Bihar MLAs 2000–2005
Bihar MLAs 2005–2010
People from Arrah
Living people
1962 births
Janata Dal (United) politicians